John Thomas Doody Jr. (born January 15, 1945) is an American politician who served as a Republican member of the Illinois House of Representatives from the 37th district from September 1995 until January 1997 and later a Judge of the Cook County Circuit Court.

Biography
Doody was born January 15, 1945, in Evergreen Park, Illinois. He attended Illinois State University and St. Procopius College, graduating with a Bachelor of Arts from the latter institution. Doody later earned a Juris Doctor from  John Marshall Law School. Doody was a soldier in the United States Army and is a veteran of the Vietnam War. Doody was, for a time, the Mayor of Homewood, Illinois.

Doody was elected a township trustee of Bloom Township in 1981, a village trustee for Homewood in 1983, and Village President of Homewood in 1991.

Doody was appointed to the Illinois House of Representatives and sworn into office on September 11, 1995, to succeed Ed Zabrocki, the Mayor of Tinley Park, Illinois, who had been elected in the 1994 elections. He was defeated by Democratic candidate Kevin McCarthy in the 1996 general election. Doody explored challenging McCarthy in the 1998 election, but opted out in favor of Maureen O'Hara who was supported by Minority Leader Lee Daniels.

After his 1996 loss, he became a member of the Homewood Public Library Board. In 2002, he became a Circuit Court Judge, a position he would hold until his retirement in 2013.

References

20th-century American politicians
People from Evergreen Park, Illinois
Republican Party members of the Illinois House of Representatives
People from Homewood, Illinois
1945 births
Living people
Mayors of places in Illinois
Benedictine University alumni
Illinois State University alumni
John Marshall Law School (Chicago) alumni
United States Army personnel of the Vietnam War
Military personnel from Illinois
Judges of the Circuit Court of Cook County